Allen Barton (born May 18, 1968) is an American playwright, director, acting teacher, and classical pianist. He is known primarily for his longtime association with the Beverly Hills Playhouse, a Los Angeles-based acting school.  His older brother, Fred Barton, is a New York-based pianist and composer.  His father, David K. Barton, is a radar-systems engineer.  His cousin was jazz saxophonist Paul Desmond.

Career

Beverly Hills Playhouse
After graduating from Harvard University in 1990, Barton relocated to Los Angeles and began his studies as an actor at the Beverly Hills Playhouse (BHP). Over the next 18 years, he completed apprenticeships as a director and teacher under Milton Katselas, BHP's founder.  Simultaneously with his artistic training, he began working part-time for BHP in 1993, rapidly ascending to become CFO in 1997 and then the school's youngest ever CEO in 2003. He began teaching for BHP in 2002, had a class under his own name in 2005, and taught alongside Katselas starting in 2007 up until Katselas' death in October 2008. Katselas bequeathed BHP ownership to Barton, who still teaches at the school and oversees its operations, including expansion to both New York and San Francisco.  He started the BHPs free-theatre concept, Project X, which presents free performances of established plays acted by BHP students.

In 2017, Barton released his book “The Oasis of Insanity,” which is a memoir of his unique apprenticeship with Katselas, as well as a guidebook to the study and pursuit of acting in the 21st century. Barton continues to maintain a blog for the BHP under the same name: The Oasis of Insanity.

Writing
Barton’s first play ENGAGEMENT was produced by the Skylight Theatre Company in Los Angeles in 2010, and was mounted as well in San Francisco in 2014. His second play, YEARS TO THE DAY (2013) received significant critical acclaim, with his writing compared to that of Albee, Mamet and George Bernard Shaw. Years to the Day was nominated in writing and acting categories by the LA Drama Critics Circle and the LA Weekly, and was one of the latter’s Ten Best Plays of 2013. It was performed in Paris in October, 2013, and also participated in the 59E59 St. Theatre’s “East To Edinburgh” Festival in June, 2014 on its way to a run at the 2014 Edinburgh Theatre Festival, and has since been performed in Kansas City, San Francisco, Ontario, with productions scheduled for Memphis as well as Adelaide, Australia. Barton’s third play, DISCONNECTION, had two successful Los Angeles runs in 2015.  His most recent play, CIRCLING, is currently in the pipeline for an equity production in the 2018-2019 season.

Directing
As a director, Barton has helmed the following Los Angeles stage productions: ABOUT FAITH (2001), I MAKE YOU LAUGHING (2004), PINK DOT (2005), BURN THIS (2006), THE LAST FIVE YEARS (2007), RABBIT HOLE (2008), THE REAL THING  (2009), ENGAGEMENT (2010), and Project X presentations of THE HEIDI CHRONICLES (2012), OLEANNA (2013), SPEED-THE-PLOW (2014), and GRUESOME PLAYGROUND INJURIES (2016).

Piano
As a classical pianist, Barton studied with Seth Kimmelman at New England Conservatory, and in Los Angeles with Bernardo Segall, Deborah Aitken and Mario Feninger. He was a prize-winner in the 2002 Los Angeles Liszt Society Competition, and has performed annual recitals in Los Angeles, New York, Boston and the New England area. He has recorded five compact discs, Debut Recital, 2, 3, 4, and 5, all available at cdbaby.com, Apple Music, and most streaming services. In 2010 he was made a Steinway Artist.

Personal life

Allen Barton grew up in Lexington, Massachusetts and has an A.B. from Harvard University, where he studied Russian & Soviet Studies, and was a VP for the Hasty Pudding Theatricals.

Barton married Tiffany Yu in 2003, and they have three children.

In the mid-late 1990s, Barton was associated with Scientology, and acted in many of their in-house films under the Golden Era Productions banner.  His last course completion was in 2000, and he appears to have had no activity with the group since then.  In 2012, he became more of an outspoken critic, as he took on the movement's "disconnection" policy, which affected Milton Katselas during his life and came to interfere with Barton's own relationship with his piano teacher Mario Feninger.  He was interviewed in 2012 for Lawrence Wright's book about Scientology, "Going Clear."

References

External links 
 
 Beverly Hills Playhouse - Allen Barton's Teacher Page
 Oasis of Insanity: The Study and Pursuit of Acting Blog by Allen Barton
 Oasis of Insanity: The Study & Pursuit of Acting at the Beverly Hills Playhouse book

1968 births
Living people
Male actors from Los Angeles
American classical pianists
American male classical pianists
20th-century American dramatists and playwrights
American former Scientologists
Harvard University alumni
People from Lexington, Massachusetts
American chief executives
American chief financial officers
20th-century American pianists